Lauren Amber Newton (born 16 November 1952) is an avant-garde jazz and contemporary classical singer and founding member of the Vienna Art Orchestra.

Biography 
Newton earned a degree in music at the University of Oregon. In 1974 she moved to Europe and continued her music studies  with Sylvia Geszty at the State University of Music and Performing Arts Stuttgart. In 1977 she joined the Vienna Art Orchestra, touring widely with the group until 1989. With Bobby McFerrin, Jeanne Lee, Urszula Dudziak and Jay Clayton she formed the Vocal Summit in 1982.

Newton combines conventional technique with unconventional vocal sounds. She has taught at the Berlin University of the Arts, University of Music and Performing Arts, Graz in Austria, Folkwang Hochschule in Essen, Germany, and Lucerne University of Applied Sciences and Arts in Lucerne, Switzerland.

Her debut album, Timbre (1983), won the Annual German Critics Award. During the next ten years she collaborated with Austrian poet Ernst Jandl. She has also worked with Jon Rose, Fritz Hauser, Vladimir Tarasov, Anthony Braxton, Christy Doran, Bernd Konrad, Peter Kowald, Joachim Kühn, Joëlle Léandre, Urs Leimgruber, Patrick Scheyder, Aki Takase, and the Südpool-Ensemble directed by Herbert Joos.

She performed Adriana Hölszky's Comment for Lauren and other works by Hans-Joachim Hespos, Bernd Konrad, Hannes Zerbe, and Wolfgang Dauner. In 1993 she performed Wolfgang Schmiedt's adaptation for solo vocalist of Mahler's Kindertotenlieder. In 1998 she participated in the international conference Frau Musica (nova) at the conservatory in Cologne, Germany.

Discography

As leader
 Timbre (hat ART, 1983)
 Voiceprint (Extraplatte, 1988)
 Art Is... (Leo Records, 1995)
 Composition 192, Anthony Braxton, (Leo Records, 1996)
 18 Colors (Leo Records), 1996
 Altered Egos (Omba, 1998)
 Filigree (Hatology), 1998)
 The Lightness of Hearing ([[Leo Records, 2002)
 Out of Sound (Leo Records), 2002)
 Timbre Plus (Arbe, 2003)
 Artesian Spirits (Leo Records, 2005)
 Face It (Leo Records, 2005)
 Spring in Bangkok (Intakt, 2006)
 SoundSongs (Leo Records, 2006)
 2 Souls in Seoul (Leo Records, 2008)
 Strings Moon (CD Baby, 2012)
 O How We (Bandcamp, 2010)
 Blindflug 2017
 Stormy Whispers (Bandcamp, 2020)

As member of Vienna Art Orchestra
 Tango from Obango (Extraplatte, 1979)
 Concerto Piccolo (hat ART, 1980)
 Suite for the Green Eighties (hat ART, 1982)
 From No Time to Rag Time (hat ART, 1982)
 The Minimalism of Erik Satie (hat ART, 1984)
 Jazzbühne Berlin 85 (Amiga, 1986)
 Nightride of a Lonely Saxophone Player (Moers, 1986)
 Inside Out (Moers, 1987)
 A Notion in Perpetual Motion (hat ART, 1985)
 Blues for Brahms (Amadeo, 1989)
 Innocence of Clichés (Amadeo, 1990)
 Highlights: Live in Vienna (1993)
 Two Little Animals (1994)

As guest
With Jon Rose
 1994 Violin Music for Supermarkets
 1995 Eine Violine fur Valentin
 1997 Shopping.Live@Victo
 1998 Techno Mit Storungen

With the Vienna Art Choir
 From No Art to Mo(z)art (Moers, 1983)
 Five Old Songs (Moers, 1984)
 Swiss Swing (Moers, 1986)

With the Vienna Art Special
 Serapionsmusic (Moers, 1984)

With others
 1996 Trio LTD, Trio LTD
 1996 Wait Until Dark, Secret Passion Orchestra
 2000 Not Missing Drums Project, Urban Voices
 2004 Grunt, Chotjewitz: The Magic of a Flute, George Gruntz
 2014 Dream a Little Dream, Pink Martini

References

External links 
 
 Encyclopedia of Jazz Musicians

1952 births
Living people
American expatriates in Germany
American expatriates in Switzerland
American women jazz singers
American jazz singers
Avant-garde singers
Free jazz singers
People from Coos Bay, Oregon
Avant-garde jazz singers
University of Oregon alumni
State University of Music and Performing Arts Stuttgart alumni
Feminist musicians
Academic staff of the Folkwang University of the Arts
Vienna Art Orchestra members
American women academics
21st-century American women